Ángel Granda Roque (born 19 August 1997) is a Spanish sailor who competed at the 2020 Summer Olympics.

Granda started windsurfing at the age of 11 at the Real Club Nautico de Gran Canaria and made his major competitive debut at the 2011 U15 World Championships in San Francisco. He claimed the under-21 title at the 2017 RS:X World Championships, finishing 15th overall in the competition.

In March 2021, Granda was announced as Spain's representative in the men's RS:X event at the delayed 2020 Summer Olympics. At the Tokyo Games he placed tenth in the qualifiers to secure his spot in the medal race.

References

External links
 
 
 
 
 
 
  

1997 births
Living people
Spanish windsurfers
Spanish male sailors (sport)
Olympic sailors of Spain
Sailors at the 2020 Summer Olympics – RS:X
RS:X class sailors
Sailors (sport) from the Gran Canaria
Real Club Náutico de Gran Canaria sailors
Sportspeople from Las Palmas
21st-century Spanish people